Luana Wanderley Moreira Lira  (born 5 March 1996) is a Brazilian diver. She represented Brazil at the World Aquatics Championships in 2015, 2017, 2019 and 2022. She represented Brazil at the 2020 Summer Olympics in Tokyo, Japan. She competed in the women's 3 metre springboard event.

In 2019, she won the silver medal in the women's team event at the Military World Games held in Wuhan, China. She competed at the 2021 FINA Diving World Cup.

References

External links

Living people
1996 births
Brazilian female divers
Divers at the 2020 Summer Olympics
Olympic divers of Brazil
Competitors at the 2022 South American Games
South American Games silver medalists for Brazil
South American Games medalists in diving
21st-century Brazilian women